David Alan Curson (born November 4, 1948) is an American union representative and former member of the United States House of Representatives, representing Michigan's 11th congressional district. He is known for having one of the shortest terms in congressional history. Curson defeated Kerry Bentivolio in a special election to replace former Representative Thaddeus McCotter, who resigned in the summer of 2012, and served less than two months.  He is a member of the Democratic Party.

Curson resides in Belleville, Michigan. He is a representative for the United Auto Workers.

Early life, education, and career
Curson was born in Toledo, Ohio, to George Curson, a heavy equipment operator for Washington Township, Lucas County, Ohio. He is the youngest of six children. After graduating from high school in 1966, Curson followed in the footsteps of his mother, working at the Libby-Owens-Ford Glass Company, and attended the University of Toledo. However, he dropped out without finishing a degree in order to serve in the United States Marine Corps. After returning from service, he began work at the Ford Rawsonville Plant in Ypsilanti, Michigan.

United Auto Workers service
While working at the Ford Rawsonville Plant, Curson became involved with the UAW and was elected as a representative for the organization. He has been a long-time member of the International Union staff and has served as director of special projects and economic analysis, executive assistant to V.P. Ron Gettelfinger, executive assistant to President Steve Yokich and executive assistant to Secretary Treasurer Dennis Williams. He began negotiating Big Three contracts in 1982 and also testified on behalf of Chrysler and GM at their bankruptcy hearings after President Obama's automotive bailouts.

Political career

Curson was elected in a special election to fill the remainder of former Representative Thaddeus McCotter's term in the 112th United States Congress. McCotter resigned in the summer of 2012 after learning that the majority of petition signatures to get him on the ballot in the August primaries were fraudulent. The Democratic nominee for the general election, Syed Taj, was not a candidate in the special election. Curson stated his intention to retire from politics immediately after his six-week term ended and return to private life, which he fulfilled; Curson was succeeded by Republican Kerry Bentivolio in January 2013, whom Curson defeated in the special election.

Political positions
Curson feels that the key to economic success is the creation of jobs. His campaign goals included an increased tax on the rich and additional funding for roads, schools, and energy systems. He also sought legislation that would allow United States employers to safely hire foreign workers more easily and was against the deportation of children brought to the United States by illegal immigrants. He also supported the Affordable Care Act and Planned Parenthood.

See also
 Brenda Jones (politician), elected in a similar situation

References

External links
 
 

1948 births
Living people
Eastern Michigan University alumni
Politicians from Toledo, Ohio
People from Belleville, Michigan
United Auto Workers people
University of Michigan alumni
University of Toledo alumni
Democratic Party members of the United States House of Representatives from Michigan
21st-century American politicians
United States Marines